Paritat Bulbon (28 October 1970 – 13 July 2017) was a Thai racing driver who competed in the TCR Thailand Touring Car Championship. Having previously competed in the Thailand Super Series, TCR International Series and TCR Asia Series.

Death
On 13 July 2017 Bulbon committed suicide by shooting himself in his Bangkok home.

Racing career
Bulbon began his career in 2010 in the Thailand Super Series, he finished fourteenth in the S2000 class standings that year and eighth in 2014. For 2016 he switched to the all new 2016 TCR Thailand Touring Car Championship, where he also took part in the 2016 TCR Asia Series round held in Thailand.

In August 2016 it was announced that he would race in the TCR International Series, driving a SEAT León Cup Racer for his own Sloth Racing team.

Racing record

Complete TCR International Series results
(key) (Races in bold indicate pole position) (Races in italics indicate fastest lap)

References

External links
 

1970 births
2017 suicides
Paritat Bulbon
TCR Asia Series drivers
TCR International Series drivers
Paritat Bulbon
Paritat Bulbon